Drew Antrion Coleman (born April 22, 1983) is a former American football cornerback. After playing college football for Texas Christian, he was selected by the New York Jets of the National Football League (NFL) in the sixth round of the 2006 NFL Draft. He played for the Jets for five seasons from 2006 to 2010 and the Jacksonville Jaguars in 2011.

High school career
Drew Coleman graduated from high school in 2001 in Henderson, Texas. Drew was a do-it-all player and became one of the best dual-threat QB's in East Texas, playing quarterback, wide receiver, running back, punt returner, kick returner, and defensive back as he led his team to a District championship his senior year.  He received multiple awards while at Henderson including District MVP, All-East Texas, Rusk County, Texas player of the year, and All-State honors.  Drew was also a standout basketball player in which he was named the District and All East-Texas Defensive MVP his junior and senior year.  Along with Rickey Dudley (TE- Oakland Raiders), Drew is one of the most influential athletes to represent Henderson High School in its history.

College career
A graduate of Henderson High School, Coleman attended Trinity Valley Community College in Athens, Texas, playing wide receiver and quarterback for two years for the Cardinals where he was the 2002 Southwest Junior College Football Conference Player of the year and also Offensive Player of the Year.  He then transferred to Texas Christian University in Fort Worth.  At TCU, he was switched to cornerback by coach Gary Patterson.  He was injured for most of the 2004 season, but as a senior in 2005 started all 12 games for the Horned Frogs' 11-1 Mountain West Conference Championship team.  He was second on the team with 4 interceptions and tied for first with 8 passes broken up.  After the season, he was named Second-team All-MWC. He majored in speech communication.

Professional career

New York Jets 

Coleman was drafted in the 6th round (189th overall) of the 2006 NFL draft.

As a rookie with the Jets in 2006, Coleman played in all 17 games as the Jets advanced to the playoffs for the first time in three years. He often played nickelback and developed into a solid special teams tackler.  He had a key forced fumble against the New England Patriots in the first game of the season, and wound up starting four games at cornerback his rookie year. He was named the Jets Special teams player of the week for week 3 win at Buffalo.

In 2007, he was a regular on special teams and later in the season was included in some defensive packages for the Jets, including getting his first interception against the Miami Dolphins on December 2, 2007, and forcing a fumble during a sack in the last game of the Jets' 2007 season on Kansas City Chiefs QB Brodie Croyle.

Coleman racked up 22 tackles in 2009. He finished the 2010 season with 41 tackles, four sacks, five forced fumbles and one interception.

Coleman made his first impact of the season by filling in for an injured Darrelle Revis against the New England Patriots in week 2. Coleman impressed greatly as he was part of a Jets defense that did not allow a touchdown in the second half of the game, which is where he made his biggest impact. In the next game against the Miami Dolphins, Coleman continued to make impact plays as he intercepted Chad Henne at the end of the game, preventing a comeback for the Dolphins. Against the Vikings the next week he would sack Brett Favre, and finish the game against the Vikings with 3 tackles and 1 sack. In week 6 he recorded 5 tackles in a win against the Denver Broncos. His most impressive game of the season came against the Pittsburgh Steelers in week 15. Coleman recorded 10 tackles, 2 sacks and 2 forced fumbles. On the Jets last regular season game, Coleman recorded 2 tackles and 1 sack.

Jacksonville Jaguars
Coleman signed a three-year contract with the Jacksonville Jaguars on July 29, 2011. Coleman played in all 16 games during the 2011 season however, he was released on May 3, 2012.

Detroit Lions
Coleman signed a one-year contract with the Detroit Lions on July 25, 2012. He was placed on injured reserve on August 16, 2012, and released from injured reserve on August 23.

Coaching career
Coleman was a defensive assistant for Rice Owls football team, and currently serves as defensive coordinator for West Brook High School in Beaumont, Texas.

References

External links
Detroit Lions bio
New York Jets bio
TCU Horned Frogs bio
Rice Owls coaching bio

1983 births
American football cornerbacks
African-American players of American football
Players of American football from Texas
Living people
People from Henderson, Texas
Trinity Valley Cardinals football players
TCU Horned Frogs football players
New York Jets players
Jacksonville Jaguars players
Detroit Lions players
21st-century African-American sportspeople
20th-century African-American people